Kimberleymelon tealei is a species of air-breathing land snail, a terrestrial pulmonate gastropod mollusk in the family Camaenidae.
Kimberleymelon tealei is the only species in the genus Kimberleymelon.

The generic name Kimberleymelon consists of "Kimberley" which is a region in Western Australia, and the suffix "-melon" which is from the Greek language meaning melon, the fleshy fruit of the family Cucurbitaceae, a reference to the globular shape of the shell. The specific name "tealei" is in honor of Roy Teale, the malacologist who collected the holotype of this species.

Distribution 
The type locality of Kimberleymelon tealei is Middle Osborn Island, Bonaparte Archipelago in north-western Kimberley, Western Australia. This species is endemic to Middle Osborn Island.

Shell description 
The shell is of trochiform shape, high-spired and has a closed umbilicus. The shell dimensions are 20–28 mm in diameter and 18–26 mm in height.

References 

Camaenidae
Gastropods described in 2010